is a Japanese anime producer. Some of his major works include Yasuhiro Nightow's Trigun television series as well as Nightow's other series Gungrave. He has worked on Shinichi Watanabe's adaptation of Excel Saga and the Geobreeders OVA series. He worked with Koichi Mashimo of Bee Train on producing what would later be known as the "girls with guns" series starting with Noir in 2001, then Madlax in 2004, and finally El Cazador de la Bruja in 2007.  In 2010 he attended Anime Expo to watch the premiere of Trigun: Badlands Rumble.

Works
 Staffed in
 Ninja Scroll (1993 film), Assistant producer
 801 T.T.S. Airbats (1994 OVA series), Producer
 Trigun (1998 TV series), Producer
 Geobreeders (1998 OVA series), Producer
 Excel Saga (1999 TV series), Producer
 Geobreeders 2 (2000 OVA series), Producer
 Noir (2001 TV series), Producer
 Aquarian Age: Sign for Evolution (2002 TV series), Producer
 Gungrave (2003 TV series), Producer, Soundtrack Executive Producer
 Madlax (2004 TV series), Producer, Soundtrack Supervisor
 El Cazador de la Bruja (2007 TV series), Producer
 Trigun: Badlands Rumble (2010 Movie), Producer

 Cast in
 Puni Puni Poemy (2001 OVA series), Producer Kitayama

 Mentioned
 旅する少女と灼熱の国, worked with the author

References

External links
 
 

Year of birth missing (living people)
Living people
Japanese film producers
Place of birth missing (living people)